The 2013–14 season will be Paksi SE's 8th competitive season, 8th consecutive season in the OTP Bank Liga and 61st year in existence as a football club.

First team squad

Transfers

Summer

In:

Out:

Winter

In:

Out:

List of Hungarian football transfers summer 2013
List of Hungarian football transfers winter 2013–14

Statistics

Appearances and goals
Last updated on 1 June 2014.

|-
|colspan="14"|Youth players:

|-
|colspan="14"|Out to loan:

|-
|colspan="14"|Players no longer at the club:

|}

Top scorers
Includes all competitive matches. The list is sorted by shirt number when total goals are equal.

Last updated on 1 June 2014

Disciplinary record
Includes all competitive matches. Players with 1 card or more included only.

Last updated on 1 June 2014

Overall
{|class="wikitable"
|-
|Games played || 39 (30 OTP Bank Liga, 1 Hungarian Cup and 8 Hungarian League Cup)
|-
|Games won || 12 (8 OTP Bank Liga, 0 Hungarian Cup and 4 Hungarian League Cup)
|-
|Games drawn || 12 (10 OTP Bank Liga, 0 Hungarian Cup and 2 Hungarian League Cup)
|-
|Games lost || 15 (12 OTP Bank Liga, 1 Hungarian Cup and 2 Hungarian League Cup)
|-
|Goals scored || 57
|-
|Goals conceded || 55
|-
|Goal difference || +2
|-
|Yellow cards || 99
|-
|Red cards || 5
|-
|rowspan="2"|Worst discipline ||  Attila Fiola (12 , 0 )
|-
|  József Windecker (8 , 2 )
|-
|rowspan="2"|Best result || 4–0 (A) v Diósgyőr – OTP Bank Liga – 26-04-2014
|-
| 4–0 (H) v Pápa – OTP Bank Liga – 17-05-2014
|-
|rowspan="1"|Worst result || 1–4 (A) v Videoton – OTP Bank Liga – 18-08-2013
|-
|rowspan="2"|Most appearances ||  Tamás Kecskés (33 appearances)
|-
|  János Szabó (33 appearances)
|-
|rowspan="1"|Top scorer ||  Attila Simon (18 goals)
|-
|Points || 48/117 (41.03%)
|-

Nemzeti Bajnokság I

Matches

Classification

Results summary

Results by round

Hungarian Cup

League Cup

Group stage

Classification

Knockout phase

Pre-season

References

External links
 Eufo
 Official Website
 UEFA
 fixtures and results

Paksi SE seasons
Hungarian football clubs 2013–14 season